Charthawal Assembly constituency is one of the 403 constituencies of the Uttar Pradesh Legislative Assembly, India. It is a part of the Muzaffarnagar district and one of the five assembly constituencies in the Muzaffarnagar Lok Sabha constituency. First election in this assembly constituency was held in 1967 after the "Delimitation Orders (1967)" was passed. From 1967 to 2008, this constituency was reserved for candidates from scheduled caste community. In 2008, after the "Delimitation of Parliamentary and Assembly Constituencies Order, 2008" was passed, this constituency was opened for all candidates.

Wards / areas
Extent of Charthawal Assembly constituency is Baghra, Charthawal, Kutesra, Dhindhawali, PCs Nara, Jarauda, Bahadarpur, Lachheda, Sujru, Bihari, Harsauli, Tawli, Simli, Vahalana, Nirmana, Barwala of Kukra KC & Charthawal NP of Muzaffarnagar Tehsil.

Members of the Legislative Assembly

Election results

2022

2017

2012

See also
Government of Uttar Pradesh
Muzaffarnagar Lok Sabha constituency
List of Vidhan Sabha constituencies of Uttar Pradesh
Muzaffarnagar district
Sixteenth Legislative Assembly of Uttar Pradesh
Uttar Pradesh Legislative Assembly
Uttar Pradesh

References

External links
 

Assembly constituencies of Uttar Pradesh
Politics of Muzaffarnagar district
Constituencies established in 1967
1967 establishments in Uttar Pradesh